Johannes Hartmann (Amberg, 14 January 1568 – Kassel, 7 December 1631) was a German chemist.

In 1609, he became the first Professor of Chemistry at the University of Marburg. His teaching dealt mainly with pharmaceuticals. He was the father-in-law of Heinrich Petraeus.

References

1568 births
Date of birth unknown
1631 deaths
Date of death unknown
People from Amberg
Academic staff of the University of Marburg
17th-century German chemists